Statistics of Swedish football Division 3 for the 1938–39 season.

League standings

Uppsvenska Östra 1938–39

Uppsvenska Västra 1938–39

Östsvenska 1938–39

Centralserien Norra 1938–39

Centralserien Södra 1938–39

Nordvästra 1938–39

Mellansvenska 1938–39

Sydöstra 1938–39

Västsvenska Norra 1938–39

Västsvenska Södra 1938–39

Sydsvenska 1938–39

Footnotes

References 

Swedish Football Division 3 seasons
3
Sweden